Monti is a given name. Notable people with the name include:

 Monti Amundson, American guitar player
 Monti Martin (1921–2000), American soldier who joined german army and became SS soldier
 Monti Belot (born 1943), Senior United States District Judge
 Monti Carlo (born 1975), Puerto Rican chef
 Monti Davis (1958–2013), American basketball player
 Monti Mohsen (born 2000), Canadian soccer player
 Monti Ossenfort (born 1976), American football executive
 Monti Sharp (born 1967),  American actor

See also
Monte (name), given name and surname
Monti (surname)
Montie, given name and surname
Monty, given name and surname